Chaqra–Doubay  is a  local authority in southern Lebanon, 116 km from Beirut; located in the Bint Jbeil District. It consists of two parts: the  village Chaqra; while  Doubay (or Qal'at ad-Dubba), located about 4 km west of the village,  is a castle dating at least to the Crusader era. Chaqra's inhabitants are called the Chaqrawis.

Geography 
The town is bounded to the northeast by Houla, to the east by Meiss Ej Jabal, to the southeast by Muhajbib, to the north by Majdel Selem, to the west by Safad-El-Batikh and Baraachit. It is located 6.8 km from the Golan Heights and the southern border of Lebanon.

Transport 
To get there, you have to take the national 3 which goes from Beirut to Tyre, then the road to Bint-Jbeil.

Demography 
There are 6,000 inhabitants in winter and more than double in summer, due to the fact that 20 million Lebanese living abroad come to visit their villages of origin.

Naming 
Shakra: means grey.

Kulat ed Dubbeh: means "The bear's castle".

History

Chaqra 
In 1596, it was named as a village, Saqra, in the Ottoman nahiya (subdistrict) of  Tibnin  under the  Liwa Safad. It had a population of  58  households and 3 bachelors, all Muslim. The villagers paid a  fixed tax rate of 25% on  agricultural products, such as wheat (6,760 akçe), barley (560 akçe), olive trees (1,500 akçe),  goats and beehives (520 akçe), in addition to occasional revenues (300 akçe); an olive oil press/press for grape syrup (12 akçe), a water mill (60 akçe); a total of 9,712 akçe.

In 1875 Victor Guérin noted: "This village is located on a plateau growing with wheat, or dotted with olive trees. It has 300 inhabitants, all Métu'alis. The mosque, facing from west to east, seems to have replaced an old 
church, from which it borrowed a number of beautiful ashlars []. Two (artificial)  pools, now very poorly maintained, and a dozen cisterns also attest to the existence in this place of a village prior to the Arab invasion".

In 1877, H.H.  Kitchener visited the area. After describing the castle, he continues: "To the west of the castle is the village of Shakra, where I obtained a copy of an inscription. The sheikh of the village was extremely rude, and threw stones against the inscription when I attempted to copy it. I therefore left without doing so, and reported the matter to the governor, who immediately put the sheikh in prison. The next time I went to the village there was no opposition to my copying the inscription, I therefore had the sheikh set at liberty."

In 1881, the PEF's Survey of Western Palestine described the village (which it called Shakra) as being "built of stone, containing about 200 Metawileh, on high-level plain, surrounded by olives and arable land; there is a mosque in the village; two birkets and several cisterns give the water supply." They further added that there were: "Several ruined modern buildings and remains of ancient ruins; several lintels and cisterns; Greek inscription on capital of column built into wall of modern house to the south-west of the mosque: [ ] There probably once stood an early Christian church here."

Doubay or Qal'at ad-Dubba 

The castle of Chaqra and Doubiye, also called Qalaat Doubal, Kulat ed Dubbeh, and Qal'at Ad-Dubba, is located in a valley about 4 km East of Chaqra.

According to Pringle, "Although largely rebuilt in Mamluk or Ottoman times, it incorporates  a tower (8.5 by 10,3 m) and other structures which betray a Frankish origin,"

In 1875 Victor Guérin noted  "the remains of a small fortress of Muslim work and called Kala't Doubey. Surrounded by a moat now half filled and planted with tobacco, it was built with fairly coarsely carved blocks. Several of the square towers that flank it are still inhabited at this time by some families of Métualis, who settled in the middle of its ruins and contain their herds.

In 1881, the PEF's Survey of Western Palestine described  the castle (which it called Kulat ed Dubbeh):

Economy 

The village lives on small trade, agriculture and a strong poultry economy.

Administration 
The village is administered by a mayor assisted by municipal councillors.

Chaqra is divided into two parts:

 Chaqra as such which is the upper part and which is inhabited;
 Doubiye, which is located in the valley, uninhabited and housing Doubiye Castle, which was built on the ruins of a Roman-era building, and said to be renamed after a French Crusade commander.

References

Bibliography

External links 
 Official site archive in arabic
Chaqra - Doubay, localiban
Survey of Western Palestine, Map 2:   IAA, Wikimedia commons
 

Populated places in the Israeli security zone 1985–2000
Populated places in Bint Jbeil District
Shia Muslim communities in Lebanon